Sinchi or Sinchis may refer to:

 Sinchis, a police battalion during the 1981 internal conflict in Peru
 Sinchi Amazonic Institute of Scientific Research, a Colombian research institute
 Sinchi FC, a soccer club from China
 Sinchi Roca, 13th-century Incan Emperor

See also 
 Antonio Sinchi Roca Inka, 17th-century Quechua painter